Zadnyaya is a rural locality (a village) in Kameshnikovskoye Rural Settlement, Sheksninsky District, Vologda Oblast, Russia. The population was 17 as of 2002.

Geography 
Zadnyaya is located 59 km north of Sheksna (the district's administrative centre) by road. Kalikino is the nearest rural locality.

References 

Rural localities in Sheksninsky District